Terminal bar or Terminal Bar may refer to:

 Terminal bar (histology), a histological term
 Terminal Bar (bar), a New York City bar that operated from 1958 to 1982
 Terminal Bar (book), a 2014 book about the bar of the same name
 Terminal Bar (film), a 2003 documentary film about the bar of the same name
 The Terminal Bar, a 1982 novel by Larry Mitchell